The Emamzadeh Ebrahim is a historical structure in Kashan, Iran. The Emamzadeh belongs to the Qajar era. It is well known for its turquoise dome, tiled minarets, pleasant yard and beautiful iwan. Paintings, tiles and decorations with cut mirrors have been added later in the early 20th century. 

The current changed structure of the Emamzadeh is a work of architects in the recent century. On the inscription of the door, it has been mentioned about the decorating with cut mirrors by the order of then governor of Kashan. On the other inscription, it has been written about the ancestry of the Imamzadeh, who has been buried there and he was apparently a descendant of Musa al-Kadhim. In the inscription, it is written also the name of the structure's founder, Khaleh Beygom. Khaleh Beygom's grave is also in the building and there are a few poems on her gravestone.

See also 
List of the historical structures in the Isfahan province

References 

Architecture in Iran
Buildings and structures in Kashan